Royal Paintbox is a documentary film directed by Margy Kinmonth that follows Charles, Prince of Wales as he reveals the rare and prolific art work of his forebears, many of whom were accomplished amateur artists, and traces his family's love of painting through the generations. Shot in Balmoral Castle, Highgrove House, Eastcote, Windsor Castle, Frogmore House & Osborne House, Royal Paintbox features art by members of the British royal family down the centuries including some of Charles, Prince of Wales's own watercolours and artist Sarah Armstrong-Jones.

Credits 
 Contributors
 Lady Antonia Fraser
 Jane, Lady Roberts
 Charles Saumarez Smith
 Marina Warner
 Jane Ridley
 Catherine Goodman
 Susannah Fiennes
 Warwick Fuller 
 Countess Mountbatten of Burma

References

External links 
 

2013 films
2010s English-language films